Love to Hate You is a South Korean streaming television series directed by Kim Jung-kwon and starring Kim Ok-vin, Teo Yoo, Kim Ji-hoon and Go Won-hee. It premiered on February 10, 2023, on Netflix.

Synopsis
A woman who hates losing to men and a man suspicious of women have warlike relationship. They eventually realize they care dearly for each other. As the old adage goes, there is a thin line between love and hate; love triumphs over the mistrust between the sexes.

Cast

Main 
 Kim Ok-vin as Yeo Mi-ran, a new lawyer at Gilmu, an entertainment law firm
 Teo Yoo as Nam Kang-ho, Korea's top actor
 Kim Ji-hoon as Do Won-jun, who gave up his dream of becoming an actor to start a management business and guided Nam Kang-ho's career
 Go Won-hee as Shin Na-eun, Yeo Mi-ran's housemate and close friend

Supporting 
 Lee Joo-bin as Oh Se-na, Nam Kang-ho's first love, who is called "the nation's first love"
 Kim Sung-ryung as Choi Soo-jin
 Song Ji-woo as Hwang Ji-ye, an actress who works with Nam Kang-ho
 Han Seo-jun as Yoon Sang-seop, a manager of Nam Kang-ho
 Choi Yoon-so as Grace
 Jeon Shin-hwan as Lee Jin-seo, Yeo Mi-ran's ex-boyfriend
Kim Ye-ryeong as Kim Eun-hee, Mi-ran's and Dae-jun's mother
 Kim Do-yeon as drama series director
 Jo Seung-hee as Kim Ji-woo
 Song Ji-woo as Hwang Ji-hye, a rookie actress acting alongside Nam Kang-ho
 Tak Aeon as a stuntman

Special appearance 
 Song Jae-hee as passenger on the plane (ep.5) 
 Hong Woo-jin as Yeo Dae-jun (ep.8)
 Yeon Jung-hoon as celebrity (ep.9)
 Eugene as celebrity (ep.9-10)
 Lee Yu-ri as celebrity (ep.9-10)

Production
On November 4, 2021, Netflix announced their new series Love to Hate You with Kim Ok-vin as Yeo Mi-ran, an entertainment lawyer, and Teo Yoo as Nam Kang-ho, Korea's top actor, who hates dating. The series would be directed by Kim Jung-kwon, written by Choi Soo-young, and produced by Binge Works. On November 15, 2021, Go Won-hee joined the cast.

Episodes

Release
The series premiered on Netflix on February 10, 2023, and was available for streaming worldwide.

Reception
Reviewer Joel Keller of Decider wrote, "The plot of Love To Hate You is definitely contrived, but the story of Mi-ran and the performance of Kim Ok-vin makes the series very watchable." Jonathon Wilson of Ready Steady Cut have the series 3 stars out of 5, writing: "Contrived and overlong, Love to Hate You is nonetheless watchable thanks to committed performances, light but effective comedy, and some interesting characterization."

References

External links
 
 
 
 Love to Hate You at Daum 

2023 South Korean television series debuts
2023 South Korean television series endings
South Korean romantic comedy television series
Korean-language Netflix original programming
2023 web series debuts